Samuel Lee Robinson (born January 1, 1948) is an American former professional basketball player.

A 6'7" forward, Robinson played college basketball at Pasadena City College and Long Beach State. In the 1969-70 season, he averaged 19.7 points and 10.3 rebounds for Long Beach State en route to their first appearance in the NCAA Tournament. Afterwards, he became the first basketball player from Long Beach State to be drafted by a professional team, joining The Floridians of the American Basketball Association. 
Robinson was also the first Long Beach State 49er to be drafted in the NBA; he was selected by the Seattle SuperSonics in 1970 on the sixth round, but never played for them or any other team in that league.

Robinson played two seasons in the ABA, averaging 11.1 points per game. He was an ABA All-Rookie Team selection in 1971.

References

External links
NBA stats at basketball-reference.com

1948 births
Living people
American men's basketball players
Basketball players from Los Angeles
Forwards (basketball)
Long Beach State Beach men's basketball players
Miami Floridians players
Parade High School All-Americans (boys' basketball)
Pasadena City Lancers men's basketball players
Seattle SuperSonics draft picks